Siah Estalakh-e Saqad ol Molk (also Romanized as Sīāh Esţalakh-e S̄aqad ol Molk ; also known as Sīāh Asţalaskh, Sīāh Asţalaskh-e S̄aqad ol Molk, and Sīāh Esţalakh) is a village in Hajji Bekandeh-ye Koshk-e Bijar Rural District, Khoshk-e Bijar District, Rasht County, Gilan Province, Iran. At the 2006 census, its population was 422, in 125 families.

References 

Populated places in Rasht County